Milleria dualis is a moth in the family Zygaenidae. It is found in India (the Khasia Hills).

References

Moths described in 1941
Chalcosiinae